Vetusta might refer to:

Vetusta (city), fictional setting for La regenta and based on Oviedo
Vetusta Morla, Spanish rock band
Vetusta Monumenta, antiquarian papers
Vetusta Placita, ancient philosophy
Real Oviedo Vetusta, Spanish football club
A number of insects, including:
Agrotis vetusta
Anaxita vetusta
Autochloris vetusta
Collita vetusta
Euphaedra vetusta
Euxoa vetusta
Lepidophora vetusta
Orgyia vetusta
Porela vetusta
Rosenbergia vetusta
Symmoca vetusta
Xylena vetusta
A number of albums by French metal band Blut Aus Nord:
Memoria Vetusta I – Fathers of the Icy Age
Memoria Vetusta II – Dialogue with the Stars
Memoria Vetusta III: Saturnian Poetry